The Oconee County School District is a public school district in Oconee County, Georgia, United States, based in Watkinsville. It serves the communities of Bishop, Bogart, North High Shoals, and Watkinsville.

Schools
The Oconee County School District has seven elementary schools, three middle schools (one to open in Fall 2023), and two high schools.

Elementary schools
 Oconee County Primary (Kindergarten-2nd Grade)
 Colham Ferry Elementary (Kinderten-5th Grade)
 Dove Creek Elementary (Kinderten-5th Grade)
 High Shoals Elementary (Kinderten-5th Grade)
 Malcom Bridge Elementary (Kinderten-5th Grade)
 Oconee County Elementary (3rd Grade-5th Grade)
 Rocky Branch Elementary (Kinderten-5th Grade)

Middle school
Malcom Bridge Middle (6th Grade-8th grade)
Oconee County Middle (6th Grade-8th grade)
Dove Creek Middle (Open in Fall 2023)

High school
North Oconee High School (9th Grade-12th Grade)
Oconee County High School (9th Grade-12th grade)

References

External links

School districts in Georgia (U.S. state)
Education in Oconee County, Georgia